Martin Jindráček (born 29 November 1989) is a Czech football player who currently plays for 1. FK Příbram.

References

External links
 
 
 

1989 births
Living people
Czech footballers
Czech First League players
Czech National Football League players
FK Teplice players
FK Ústí nad Labem players
FC Slavoj Vyšehrad players
FK Baník Most players
1. FK Příbram players
Association football midfielders
People from Roudnice nad Labem
Czech Republic youth international footballers
Sportspeople from the Ústí nad Labem Region